Maharajadhiraj Raj Rajeshwar Shrimant Malhar Rao III Holkar VII Subadar Bahadur (1806–27 October 1833), belonging to the Holkar dynasty of the Marathas was the Maharaja of (Holkar State) (r. 1811–1833). He was born at Bhanpura in 1806 and was the only son of Yashwant Rao Holkar, Subadar of the Holkar Domains, and his wife Krishna Bai Holkar Mahasahiba.

See also
 Rao Tula Ram

References

1806 births
1833 deaths
Maharajas of Indore